Polythlipta distinguenda is a moth in the family Crambidae. It was described by Karl Grünberg in 1910. It is found in the Democratic Republic of the Congo (the former Katanga Province) and Uganda.

References

Spilomelinae
Moths described in 1910